Chalybion flebile is a species of mud dauber wasps belonging to the family Sphecidae.

Description
Head, thorax and abdomen are metallic blue-green. Antennae are black. Forewings are darkened.

Distribution
This species is present in Greece, Italy, Portugal, Spain, North Africa and in the Near East.

References 

 ITIS Bees: World Bee Checklist. Ruggiero M. (project leader), Ascher J. et al.

External links
 Chalybion flebile - Biodiversity Heritage Library - Bibliography
 Chalybion flebile - NCBI Taxonomy Database
 Chalybion flebile - Global Biodiversity Information Facility
 Chalybion flebile - Encyclopedia of Life

Sphecidae
Insects described in 1845
Hymenoptera of Europe
Taxa named by Amédée Louis Michel le Peletier